The Milkor 37/38mm Less Lethal "Stopper" Single-shot was designed and distributed in 1981 by Milkor (Pty) Ltd as a less-lethal anti-riot weapon along with the Milkor 40mm Single shot Grenade Launcher which was designed as a reduced-cost grenade launcher for the SWAPOL Forces. In 2008, Milkor (Pty) Ltd released a new design designated the Milkor 37/38mm or 40mm Stopper Convertible, which is a single shot break-open weapon designed to utilize a variety of 37/38mm or 40mm Less Lethal rounds. As with the original Milkor MGL, the Stopper was originally marketed for Milkor by Armscor (South Africa).

Design
The Milkor Stopper is a riot gun used for riot control, designed to fire a 37/38mm or 40mm cartridge, which can be a 9mm Buckshot, Rubber ball buckshot, teargas canister, rubber shot cartridge or explosive. The weapon is simple to operate and all metal surfaces are treated with a coating for corrosion protection, plus long-life dry film lubrication. It fires one shot before reloading.  It is a conventional single shot, break-open weapon (opening at the breech like an ordinary shotguns (not pump-action)) with a floating firing pin mechanism that ensures safety when accidentally dropped. As a security or assault weapon, it can be fired from the shoulder or like a pistol by hand. The components of the weapon are interchangeable (client dependent), providing a range of applications from Less Lethal 37/38mm to a 40mm Lethal weapon.

Variants
 (1981) The Milkor 37/38mm Less Lethal “Stopper” Single-shot
 (1981) The Milkor 40mm Single Shot Grenade Launcher
 (2008) The 37/38mm or 40mm Stopper Convertible

See also
HK69 grenade launcher
Flash-ball

Reference list

External links
  Milkor Product Timeline
 

Grenade launchers of South Africa
Infantry support weapons
Projectile weapons
Teargas grenade guns